These are the Billboard Holiday Digital Song Sales chart number one hits from 2010 until 2019.  The chart represents the top-downloaded Holiday songs, ranked by sales data as compiled by Nielsen SoundScan.

See also 
 Billboard Christmas Holiday Charts
 List of Billboard number one Holiday Digital Song Sales of the 2020s
 List of Billboard number one Holiday Songs 2001-2010
 List of Billboard Top Holiday Albums number ones of the 2010s

References

External links 
 Top Holiday Digital Song Sales chart at Billboard

Billboard charts